Muskeg River 20C is an Indian reserve of the Cumberland House Cree Nation in Saskatchewan. It is in Township 58, Range 5, west of the Second Meridian.

References

Indian reserves in Saskatchewan